Silver Dawn is an outdoor 1980 stainless steel sculpture by Spanish American artist Manuel Izquierdo, installed at Wallace Park in northwest Portland, Oregon, in the United States.

Description and history
Silver Dawn is a stainless steel sculpture designed by Manuel Izquierdo, who moved to Portland and became professor emeritus at his alma mater Museum Art School (now Pacific Northwest College of Art) after fleeing Spain following the Spanish–American War. The sculpture was funded by Esco Corporation, Schnitzer, PDC, MAC and NW Service Dist. and completed in 1980. It is installed in Wallace Park at Northwest 25th Avenue and Northwest Raleigh Street and measures  x  x . According to the Regional Arts & Culture Council, which administers the work, Silver Dawn is "an excellent example of the large biomorphic abstract sculptures that Manuel Izquierdo was known for". It is part of the City of Portland and Multnomah County Public Art Collection courtesy of the Regional Arts & Culture Council.

See also

 1980 in art
 The Dreamer (1979), Portland, Oregon
 Unfolding Rhythms (1987), Portland, Oregon

References

External links
 Silver Dawn at the Public Art Archive
 Silver Dawn, Portland, OR at Waymarking
 2009 Report to the Community (PDF), Regional Arts & Culture Council

1980 establishments in Oregon
1980 sculptures
Northwest District, Portland, Oregon
Outdoor sculptures in Portland, Oregon
Sculptures by American artists
Stainless steel sculptures in Oregon